Ali Farka Touré is the first major album by Ali Farka Touré.

Track listing
All songs written by Ali Farka Touré.

 Timbarma – 5:08
 Singya – 5:26
 Nawiye – 5:40
 Bakoytereye – 5:02
 Tchigi Fo – 4:30
 Amandrai – 7:19
 Kadi Kadi – 5:27
 Yulli – 5:19
 Bakoye – 4:10
 Amandrai (Live) – 10:01

Tracks 5 and 6 do not appear on vinyl.

Personnel
Ali Farka Touré – vocals, guitar, calabash, bongos
Toumani Diabaté – calabash on track 6

References
 [ Ali Farka Touré] at Allmusic

1988 albums
Ali Farka Touré albums
World Circuit (record label) albums